The glomerulus (plural glomeruli) is a network of small blood vessels (capillaries) known as a tuft,  located at the beginning of a nephron in the kidney. Each of the two kidneys contains about one million nephrons. The tuft is structurally supported by the mesangium (the space between the blood vessels), composed of intraglomerular mesangial cells. The blood is filtered across the capillary walls of this tuft through the glomerular filtration barrier, which yields its filtrate of water and soluble substances to a cup-like sac known as Bowman's capsule. The filtrate then enters the renal tubule of the nephron.

The glomerulus receives its blood supply from an afferent arteriole of the renal arterial circulation. Unlike most capillary beds, the glomerular capillaries exit into efferent arterioles rather than venules. The resistance of the efferent arterioles causes sufficient hydrostatic pressure within the glomerulus to provide the force for ultrafiltration.

The glomerulus and its surrounding Bowman's capsule constitute a renal corpuscle, the basic filtration unit of the kidney. The rate at which blood is filtered through all of the glomeruli, and thus the measure of the overall kidney function, is the glomerular filtration rate.

Structure

The glomerulus is a tuft of capillaries located within Bowman's capsule within the kidney. Glomerular mesangial cells structurally support the tufts. Blood enters the capillaries of the glomerulus by a single arteriole called an afferent arteriole and leaves by an efferent arteriole. The capillaries consist of a tube lined by endothelial cells with a central lumen. The gaps between these endothelial cells are called fenestrae. The walls have a unique structure: there are pores between the cells that allow water and soluble substances to exit and after passing through the glomerular basement membrane and between podocyte foot processes, enter the capsule as ultrafiltrate.

Lining

Capillaries of the glomerulus are lined by endothelial cells. These contain numerous pores—also called fenestrae—, 50–100 nm in diameter. Unlike those of other capillaries with fenestrations, these fenestrations are not spanned by diaphragms. They allow for the filtration of fluid, blood plasma solutes and protein, at the same time preventing the filtration of red blood cells, white blood cells, and platelets.

The glomerulus has a glomerular basement membrane consisting mainly of laminins, type IV collagen, agrin, and nidogen, which are synthesized and secreted by both endothelial cells and podocytes: thus, the glomerular basement membrane is sandwiched between the glomerular capillaries and the podocytes. The glomerular basement membrane is 250–400 nm in thickness, which is thicker than basement membranes of other tissue. It is a barrier to blood proteins such as albumin and globulin.

The part of the podocyte in contact with the glomerular basement membrane is called a podocyte foot process or pedicle (Fig. 3): there are gaps between the foot processes through which the filtrate flows into Bowman's capsule. The space between adjacent podocyte foot processes is spanned by slit diaphragms consisting of a mat of proteins, including podocin and nephrin. In addition, foot processes have a negatively charged coat (glycocalyx) that repels negatively charged molecules such as serum albumin.

Mesangium
The mesangium is a space which is continuous with the smooth muscles of the arterioles. It is outside the capillary lumen but surrounded by capillaries. It is in the middle (meso) between the capillaries (angis). It is contained by the basement membrane, which surrounds both the capillaries and the mesangium.

The mesangium contains mainly:
 Intraglomerular mesangial cells. They are not part of the filtration barrier but are specialized pericytes that participate in the regulation of the filtration rate by contracting or expanding: they contain actin and myosin filaments to accomplish this. Some mesangial cells are in physical contact with capillaries, whereas others are in physical contact with podocytes. There is two-way chemical cross talk among the mesangial cells, the capillaries, and the podocytes to fine-tune the glomerular filtration rate.
 Mesangial matrix, an amorphous basement membrane-like material secreted by the mesangial cells.

Blood supply

The glomerulus receives its blood supply from an afferent arteriole of the renal arterial circulation. Unlike most capillary beds, the glomerular capillaries exit into efferent arterioles rather than venules. The resistance of the efferent arterioles causes sufficient hydrostatic pressure within the glomerulus to provide the force for ultrafiltration.

Blood exits the glomerular capillaries by an efferent arteriole instead of a venule, as is seen in the majority of capillary systems (Fig. 4).  This provides tighter control over the blood flow through the glomerulus, since arterioles dilate and constrict more readily than venules, owing to their thick circular smooth muscle layer (tunica media). The blood exiting the efferent arteriole enters a renal venule, which in turn enters a renal interlobular vein and then into the renal vein.

Cortical nephrons near the corticomedullary junction (15% of all nephrons) are called juxtamedullary nephrons. The blood exiting the efferent arterioles of these nephrons enter the vasa recta, which are straight capillary branches that deliver blood to the renal medulla. These vasa recta run adjacent to the descending and ascending loop of Henle and participate in the maintenance of the medullary countercurrent exchange system.

Filtrate drainage
The filtrate that has passed through the three-layered filtration unit enters Bowman's capsule. From there, it flows into the renal tubule—the nephron—which follows a U-shaped path to the collecting ducts, finally exiting into a renal calyx as urine.

Function

Filtration

The main function of the glomerulus is to filter plasma to produce glomerular filtrate, which passes down the length of the nephron tubule to form urine. The rate at which the glomerulus produces filtrate from plasma (the glomerular filtration rate) is much higher than in systemic capillaries because of the particular anatomical characteristics of the glomerulus. Unlike systemic capillaries, which receive blood from high-resistance arterioles and drain to low-resistance venules, glomerular capillaries are connected in both ends to high-resistance arterioles: the afferent arteriole, and the efferent arteriole. This arrangement of two arterioles in series determines the high hydrostatic pressure on glomerular capillaries, which is one of the forces that favor filtration to Bowman's capsule.

If a substance has passed through the glomerular capillary endothelial cells, glomerular basement membrane, and podocytes, then it enters the lumen of the tubule and is known as glomerular filtrate. Otherwise, it exits the glomerulus through the efferent arteriole and continues circulation as discussed below and as shown on the picture.

Permeability

The structures of the layers determine their permeability-selectivity (permselectivity). The factors that influence permselectivity are the negative charge of the basement membrane and the podocytic epithelium, as well as the effective pore size of the glomerular wall (8 nm). As a result, large and/or negatively charged molecules will pass through far less frequently than small and/or positively charged ones. For instance, small ions such as sodium and potassium pass freely, while larger proteins, such as hemoglobin and albumin have practically no permeability at all.

The oncotic pressure on glomerular capillaries is one of the forces that resist filtration. Because large and negatively charged proteins have a low permeability, they cannot filtrate easily to Bowman's capsule. Therefore, the concentration of these proteins tends to increase as the glomerular capillaries filtrate plasma, increasing the oncotic pressure along Ofa glomerular capillary.

Starling equation
The rate of filtration from the glomerulus to Bowman's capsule is determined (as in systemic capillaries) by the Starling equation:

  is the glomerular filtration rate
  is the filtration coefficient—a proportionality constant
  is the glomerular capillary hydrostatic pressure
  is the Bowman's capsule hydrostatic pressure
  is the glomerular capillary oncotic pressure
  is the Bowman's capsule oncotic pressure

Blood pressure regulation
The walls of the afferent arteriole contain specialized smooth muscle cells that synthesize renin. These juxtaglomerular cells play a major role in the renin–angiotensin system, which helps regulate blood volume and pressure.

Clinical significance

Damage to the glomerulus by disease can allow passage through the glomerular filtration barrier of red blood cells, white blood cells, platelets, and blood proteins such as albumin and globulin. Underlying causes for glomerular injury can be inflammatory, toxic or metabolic. These can be seen in the urine (urinalysis) on microscopic and chemical (dipstick) examination.  Glomerular diseases include diabetic kidney disease, glomerulonephritis (inflammation),  glomerulosclerosis (hardening of the glomeruli), and IgA nephropathy.

Due to the connection between the glomerulus and the glomerular filtration rate, the glomerular filtration rate is of clinical significance when suspecting a kidney disease, or when following up a case with known kidney disease, or when risking a development of renal damage such as beginning medications with known nephrotoxicity.

History
In 1666, Italian biologist and anatomist Marcello Malpighi first described the glomeruli and demonstrated their continuity with the renal vasculature (281,282). About 175 years later, surgeon and anatomist William Bowman elucidated in detail the capillary architecture of the glomerulus and the continuity between its surrounding capsule and the proximal tubule.

See also 
 Glomerulus
 Blood–brain barrier

Additional images

References

Sources

 
 

Kidney anatomy